Gymnothorax andamanensis is a species from the moray eel family found in South Andaman, India. The dorsal fin is situated behind the gill, its teeth is flat and a black rim covers the jaw opening. It has around 135 to 136 vertebrae. This mid-sized fish is brown and it has an unpatterned body. It is fairly long with a dull snout and smooth teeth.

References 

Fish described in 2019
andamanensis